Pedro Cabral (born 29 June 1983 in Lisbon) is a Portuguese rugby union player. He plays as a fly-half and as a fullback.

He is currently a member of CDUL. He also plays for Lusitanos XV for the Amlin Challenge Cup.

He has 37 caps for Portugal, from 2006 to 2011, with 2 tries, 24 conversions, 37 penalties and 5 drop goals, 184 points on aggregate. He was called for the 2007 Rugby World Cup, playing in the games with Scotland and Italy, without scoring.

References

External links
Pedro Cabral on ESPN Scrum.com

1983 births
Living people
Portuguese rugby union players
Portugal international rugby union players
Rugby union fly-halves
Rugby union fullbacks
Rugby union players from Lisbon